Teman or Teiman may refer to:

 Teman or Teiman, the Hebrew for Yemen, homeland of the Temani or Teimani, the Yemenite Jews 
 In the Tanakh, Job's friend Eliphaz was a Temani
 In the Book of Genesis, Teman is a son of Eliphaz, Esau's eldest son 
 Teman (Edom), an Edomite clan and an ancient biblical town of Arabia Petraea
 Teman Mono-Fly, an American ultralight aircraft designed by structural engineer Bob Teman and produced by Teman Aircraft, Inc.

See also 
 Sharieh-ye Omm-e Teman, a village in Gharb-e Karun Rural District, in the Central District of Khorramshahr County, Khuzestan Province, Iran